Big stick ideology, big stick diplomacy, or big stick policy refers to President Theodore Roosevelt's foreign policy, "speak softly and carry a big stick;  you will go far". Roosevelt described his style of foreign policy as "the exercise of intelligent forethought and of decisive action sufficiently far in advance of any likely crisis". As practiced by Roosevelt, big stick diplomacy had five components. First, it was essential to possess serious military capability that would force the adversary to pay close attention. At the time that meant a world-class navy; Roosevelt never had a large army at his disposal. The other qualities were to act justly toward other nations, never to bluff, to strike only when prepared to strike hard, and to be willing to allow the adversary to save face in defeat.  

The idea is negotiating peacefully but also having strength in case things go wrong. Simultaneously threatening with the "big stick", or the military, ties in heavily with the idea of Realpolitik, which implies a pursuit of political power that resembles Machiavellian ideals. It is comparable to gunboat diplomacy, as used in international politics by the  powers.

Background 
Roosevelt (then Governor of New York) to Henry L. Sprague, dated January 26, 1900. Roosevelt wrote, in a bout of happiness after forcing New York's Republican committee to pull support away from a corrupt financial adviser:

Roosevelt would go on to be elected Vice President later that year, and subsequently used the aphorism publicly in an address to the Minnesota State Fair, entitled "National Duties", on September 2, 1901:

Usage 
Although used before his presidency, Roosevelt used military muscle several times throughout his two terms with a more subtle touch to complement his diplomatic policies and enforcing the Monroe Doctrine throughout multiple interventions in Latin America. This included the Great White Fleet, 16 battleships which peacefully circumnavigated the globe as an illustration of United States's rising yet neutral prestige under Roosevelt's direction.

Latin America

Venezuelan Affair (1902) and the Roosevelt Corollary 

In the early 20th century, Venezuela was receiving messages from Britain and Germany about "acts of violence against the liberty of British subjects and the massive capture of British vessels" who were from the UK and the lack of Venezuelan initiative to pay off long-standing debts. After the Royal Navy and Imperial German Navy took naval action with a blockade on Venezuela (1902–1903), Roosevelt denounced the blockade. The blockade began the basis of the Roosevelt Corollary to the Monroe doctrine. Though he had mentioned the basis of his idea beforehand in private letters, he officially announced the corollary in 1904, stating that he only wanted the "other republics on this continent" to be "happy and prosperous". For that goal to be met, the corollary required that they "maintain order within their borders and behave with a just obligation toward outsiders".

Most historians, such as one of Roosevelt's many biographers Howard K. Beale have summarized that the corollary was influenced by Roosevelt's personal beliefs as well as his connections to foreign bondholders. The U.S. public was very "tense" during the two-month blockade, and Roosevelt requested that Britain and Germany pull out their forces from the area. During the requests for the blockade's end, Roosevelt stationed naval forces in Cuba, to ensure "the respect of Monroe doctrine" and the compliance of the parties in question. The doctrine was never ratified by the senate or brought up for a vote to the American public. Roosevelt's declaration was the first of many presidential decrees in the twentieth century that were never ratified.

Canal diplomacy 
The U.S. used the "big stick" during "Canal Diplomacy", the diplomatic actions of the U.S. during the pursuit of a canal across Central America. Both Nicaragua and Panama featured canal related incidents of big stick diplomacy.

Proposed construction of the Nicaragua Canal 

In 1901, Secretary of State John Hay pressed the Nicaraguan Government for approval of a canal. Nicaragua would receive $1.5 million in ratification, $100,000 annually, and the U.S. would "provide sovereignty, independence, and territorial integrity". Nicaragua then returned the contract draft with a change; they wished to receive, instead of an annual $100,000, $6 million in ratification. The U.S. accepted the deal, but, after Congress approved the contract, a problem of court jurisdiction came up. The U.S. did not have legal jurisdiction in the land of the future canal. This problem was on the verge of correction until pro-Panama representatives posed problems for Nicaragua; the current leader (General José Santos Zelaya) did not cause problems, from the outlook of U.S. interests.

Construction of the Panama Canal 

In 1899, the Isthmian Canal Commission was set up to determine which site would be best for the canal (Nicaragua or Panama) and then to oversee construction of the canal. After Nicaragua was ruled out, Panama was the obvious choice. A few problems had arisen, however. With the U.S.'s solidified interests in Panama (then a small portion of Colombia), both Colombia and the French company that was to provide the construction materials raised their prices. The U.S., refusing to pay the higher-than-expected fees, "engineered a revolution" in Colombia. On November 3, 1903, Panama (with the support of the United States Navy) revolted against Colombia. Panama became a new republic, receiving $10 million from the U.S. alone. Panama also gained an annual payment of $250,000, and guarantees of independence. The U.S. gained the rights to the canal strip "in perpetuity". Roosevelt later said that he "took the Canal, and let Congress debate". After Colombia lost Panama, they tried to appeal to the U.S. by the reconsidering of treaties and even naming Panama City the capital of Colombia.

Cuba 

The U.S., after the Spanish–American War, had many expansionists who wanted to annex Cuba. Many people felt that a foreign power (outside of the U.S.) would control a portion of Cuba, thus the U.S. could not continue with its interests in Cuba. Although many advocated annexation, this was prevented by the Teller Amendment, which states "hereby disclaims any disposition of intention to exercise sovereignty, jurisdiction, or control over said island except for pacification thereof, and asserts its determination, when that is accomplished, to leave the government and control of the island to its people". When summarized, this could mean that the U.S. would not interfere with Cuba and its peoples. The expansionists argued though, that the Teller Amendment was created "ignorant of actual conditions" and that this released the U.S. from its obligation. Following the debate surrounding the Teller Amendment, the Platt Amendment took effect. The Platt Amendment (the name is a misnomer; the Platt Amendment is actually a rider to the Army Appropriation Act of 1901) was accepted by Cuba in late 1901, after "strong pressure" from Washington. The Platt Amendment, summarized by Thomas A. Bailey in "Diplomatic History of the American People":

 Cuba was not to make decisions impairing her independence or to permit a foreign power [e.g., Germany] to secure lodgment in control over the island.
 Cuba pledged herself not to incur an indebtedness beyond her means [It might result in foreign intervention].
 The United States was at liberty to intervene for the purpose of preserving order and maintaining Cuban independence.
 Cuba would agree to an American-sponsored sanitation program [Aimed largely at yellow fever].
 Cuba would agree to sell or lease to the United States sites for naval or coaling stations [Guantánamo became the principal base].

With the Platt Amendment in place, Roosevelt pulled the troops out of Cuba. A year later, Roosevelt wrote:

See also 

Pax Americana
Peace through strength
History of U.S. foreign policy, 1897–1913

Notes

References

External links
 A site about Big Stick Ideology
 Information about the political aspects of the Big Stick

Hegemony
American political catchphrases
Banana Wars
Presidency of Theodore Roosevelt
Foreign policy doctrines of the United States
Metaphors referring to objects
Military diplomacy